The SNCF BB 1280 class were a class of 600 V DC 4 axle Bo′Bo′ electric locomotives, formerly Compagnie du chemin de fer de Paris à Orléans machines (originally PO E.1 to E.13), initially built for an underground section of line connecting the Gare d'Austerlitz to the Quai d'Orsay in inner Paris. The locomotives were converted for 1500 V DC use in the 1930s, and renumbered PO E.281 to E.293. They were absorbed by the SNCF, and operated as shunters until the late 1960s.

History

At the end of the 19th century the Compagnie du chemin de fer de Paris à Orléans (PO) was seeking to extend its railway into a more central location in Paris: an extension from the Gare de Austerlitz to the new Gare du Quai d'Orsay was constructed, including covered sections; the new section was similar to the recently constructed Baltimore Belt Line (USA), constructed by the  Baltimore and Ohio Railroad (B&O) and operated by electric locomotives built by General Electric, which had worked well, and achieved speeds of 80 km/h.

Eight locomotives were ordered for the new line, delivered between 1900 and 1904, numbered E1 to E8, with electrical equipment from GE, and mechanical equipment and structural parts manufactured by Blanc-Misseron. The line was electrified by 600 V DC, supplied by a third rail, with overhead collection via a mini-pantograph in the Orsay tunnel. Unlike the B&O locomotives the PO units used geared drive, rather than the co-axial gearless motor drive of the 1896 B&O machines.

Locomotive E.1 was exhibited at the 1900 Exposition Universelle in Paris.

The first eight units were a single cab steeplecab design. Further units were acquired as the system's electrification spread beyond the initial Orsay-Austerlitz line; five units were acquired, with a twin cab design, with a baggage compartment (locomotives-fourgon).

In service the locomotives were used throughout the PO system where electrified; the initial specifications of the design, matching those used for the tunnel shuttle service on the Baltimore Belt Line were too low geared for the general network, and in 1904 seven locomotives were upgeared and the top speed raised to 100 km/h.

In the late 1920s/1930s 1500 V DC began to be used on the PO rail system; the locomotives were converted for 1500 V operation at workshops at Vitry-sur-Seine using a Metadyne for traction control. A new pantograph as well as sand boxes were added. After conversion the class were renumbered E.281 to E.293. During the second half of the units operational life they were used for shunting at depots to the southwest of Paris.

In 1949 the units were renumbered BB 1280 to BB 1293 as part of the SNCF. The class were withdrawn between 1965-7.

One unit, numbered E.1 is preserved at the Musée français du chemin de fer in Mulhouse.

Models
Tin plate version of the locomotive were manufactured by Maerklin in Gauge I, and by Bing, LR, and Jouet de Paris (Jep) in Gauge 0.

Kit versions have been produced by Maison des Trains, Pullman, RMCF Keyser, and Apogée Vapeur in HO scale.

See also
LNER Class ES1, steeplecab electric locomotive originally built for the North Eastern Railway, also derived from the GE design

Notes

References

Sources
, alt. source

External links

SNCF locomotives
General Electric locomotives
Compagnie du chemin de fer de Paris à Orléans locomotives
Standard gauge electric locomotives of France
Railway locomotives introduced in 1900
ANF locomotives
Bo′Bo′ locomotives